Zincirlikuyu is a station on the Istanbul Metrobus Bus rapid transit line. It is located beneath Barbaros Boulevard and between the Istanbul Inner Beltway in south Levent. The station is a terminus for three of the seven Metrobus bus routes, leading to frequent transfers between Buses. A connection to the M2 of the Istanbul Metro is available as well as several city bus lines. Due to its location near the city's main financial district, Zincirlikuyu is one of the busiest stations on the Metrobus system.

The station was opened on 8 September 2008 as part of the ten station eastward expansion of the line.

References

External links
Zincirlikuyu station

Istanbul Metrobus stations
2008 establishments in Turkey
Beşiktaş